Berenice Xuyami Quezada Herrera (born 28 September 1993) is a Nicaraguan model and beauty pageant titleholder who was crowned Miss Nicaragua 2017 and represented Nicaragua at the Miss Universe 2017 pageant.

In the 2021 Nicaraguan general election, Quezada was the running mate of Oscar Sobalvarro, presidential candidate for the Citizens for Liberty (CxL) party. However on August 3, she was placed under house arrest and barred from running.

Early life and education
Quezada was born in El Rama, Nicaragua. 

Quezada holds a degree in Tourism and Hotel Management.

Miss Nicaragua 2017

On March 25, 2017, Quezada was crowned Miss Nicaragua 2017 by her predecessor Marina Jacoby. Quezada represented Nicaragua at Miss Universe 2017 but did not place.

Politics 
Following mass arrests of opposition candidates for president in the 2021 Nicaraguan general election as well as other civic leaders, and the cancellation of the legal status of other opposition parties, the Citizens for Liberty (CxL) party declared its own vice-president, former Contra commander Oscar Sobalvarro, to be its nominee for president, and Quezada was named his running mate.

Quezada was a visible participant in the 2018–2021 Nicaraguan protests; however she also modeled for Nicaragua Diseña, one of the media outlets directed by Camila Ortega, daughter of incumbent president Daniel Ortega and his wife vice-president Rosario Murillo, whom she and Sobalvarro were running against in the 2021 election. Quezada has also made social media posts about supporting their party, the Sandinista National Liberation Front.

On the night of August 3, 2021, Quezada was put under house arrest and barred from running.

References

External links
 Official Miss Nicaragua website

1994 births
Living people
Nicaraguan beauty pageant winners
Miss Universe 2017 contestants
Nicaraguan female models
Miss Nicaragua winners